Michel Bauwens (born 21 March 1958) is a Belgian theorist in the emerging field of peer-to-peer (P2P) collaboration, writer, and conference speaker on the subject of technology, culture and business innovation. Bauwens founded the P2P Foundation, a global organization of researchers working in open collaboration in the exploration of peer production, governance, and property. He has authored a number of essays, including his thesis The Political Economy of Peer Production.

Biography
Bauwens regularly lectures internationally on P2P theory, the resource commons and their potential for social change, taking a materialistic-conceptual approach. 

In the first semester of 2014 Bauwens was research director with the FLOK Society (Free Libre Open Knowledge) at the National Institute of Advanced Studies of Ecuador (IAEN). The FLOK Society developed a first of its kind Commons Transition Plan for the Ecuadorian government. Over fifteen policy papers the plan outlines policy proposals for transitioning Ecuador to what is described as a social knowledge economy based on the creation and support of open knowledge commons. One version of the plan is available online.

He currently lives in Chiang Mai, Thailand.

P2P theory
In The Political Economy of Peer Production Bauwens regards P2P phenomena as an emerging alternative to capitalism, although he argues that "peer production is highly dependent on the market for peer production produces use-value [sic?] through mostly immaterial production, without directly providing an income for its producers." However, Bauwens goes on to argue that the interdependence is mutual: the capitalist system and market economies are also dependent on P2P production, particularly on distributed networks of information processing and production. Consequently, P2P economy may be seen as extending or already existing outside the sphere of free/open source software production and other non-rival immaterial goods.

This idea is explored also in the essay Peer to Peer and Human Evolution that expands the P2P meme beyond computer technology. It argues that egalitarian networking is a new form of relationship that is emerging throughout society, and profoundly transforming the way in which society and human civilization is organised. The essay argues that new forms of non-representational politics are a crucial ingredient in finding the solutions to current global challenges; as well as a new and progressive ethos representing the highest aspirations of the new generations.

Honors and awards
 2012 - Bauwen was nominated and included on the Post Growth Institute Enrich List – a parody of the Forbes List of Billionaires that aims to highlight influential post-growth thinkers "whose collective contributions enrich paths to sustainable futures".

Controversy
Bauwens has repeatedly spoken out against identity politics, claiming it as antithetical to egalitarian participation within a post-racial community. This perspective was criticized as being a form of racial color blindness. In response, numerous contributors to the P2P Forum chose to officially distance themselves from him and his views. 
In May 2021, Bauwens allegedly removed several signatories of the disassociation statement from the P2P Foundation wiki. Since it is a community-maintained wiki, this raised further controversy. Two weeks later, Bauwens also edited the P2PF wiki article of P2P Lab (where several signatories belonged) diminishing its role. The wiki entries have been restored by other wiki editors.

Works
Bauwens has written for Open Democracy and Al Jazeera and has been mentioned by the New York Times, De Morgen, and Living Green Magazine.

Books
2013, "De wereld redden Met peer-to-peer naar een postkapitalistische samenleving", by Michel Bauwens and Jean Lievens, Houtekiet , 
2014, "Network Society and Future Scenarios for a Collaborative Economy", by Vasilis Kostakis and Michel Bauwens, Palgrave Macmillan, 
2015, "Sauver le monde, Vers une société post-capitaliste avec le peer-to-peer", by Michel Bauwens and Jean Lievens, Les liens qui libèrent preface by Bernard Stiegler (at editionslesliensquiliberent),

Essays
Peer-to-Peer Relationality by Michel Bauwens, 4 March 2012, published on blog.p2pfoundation.net
2014, "From the Communism of Capital to Capital for the Commons: Towards an Open Co-operativism", Bauwens, Michel and Vasilis Kostakis, Triple-C: Communication, Capitalism & Critique, 12(1)

Reports
 A Synthetic Overview of the Collaborative Economy. By Michel Bauwens, Nicolas Mendoza and Franco Iacomella, et al. Orange Labs and P2P Foundation, 2012.

Documentaries
 With Frank Theys, Bauwens is the co-creator of the 2006 documentary TechnoCalyps, an examination of transhumanism and the 'metaphysics of technology'.

Speeches
 In September 2014 he gave a keynote at the Degrowth Conferences in Leipzig, Germany on "The Transition to a Sustainable Commons Society in Ecuador and beyond".

See also

 Adhocracy
 Commonfare
 Commons-based peer production
 Daemon & Freedom™, a novel series
 Digital revolution
 Distributed economy
 Knowledge commons
 Network economy
 Open design
 Open Source Ecology
 Open source hardware
 Open-source movement
 P2P economic system
 Post-scarcity economy
 Sharing economy

References

External links

 The Foundation for P2P Alternatives (official site)
 P2P: A blueprint for the future? - Interview by Richard Poynder,3 September 2006, published on poynder.blogspot.com
 Interview with Michel Bauwens - Interview by Prodromos Tsiavos, University of Oslo, spring 2008 (video, 30 min)
 De meest inspirerende belg - "The most inspiring Belgian", Interview, published by één, Café Corsari, 16 October 2013, in Belgian (video, 10 min)

1958 births
Living people
Integral thought
Belgian activists
Belgian political writers
Intellectual property activism
Belgian male writers
21st-century Belgian writers